Benedict Samuel (born 15 April 1988) is an Australian actor, writer, and director best known for playing Jervis Tetch / Mad Hatter in the Fox crime series Gotham and as Owen in The Walking Dead.

Early life
Samuel was born in Adelaide, Australia, to Maree and Clifford Samuel. The youngest of three siblings, his brother is actor Xavier Samuel and his sister, Bridget Samuel, the eldest, is a stage manager.  Benedict attended Christian Brothers College in Adelaide, and is a graduate of The National Institute of Dramatic Art (NIDA).

Career
Following his education at NIDA, Samuel began writing and directing a number of short films including Sanctuary which was released in 2012  and starred his brother Xavier Samuel in the leading role.  In theatre, he performed in Sex Wars, a production he appeared in during his time at NIDA. He played a part in 'Tis Pity She's a Whore at the Malthouse Theatre in Melbourne.

In 2011, Benedict appeared on several Australian television series including the mini-series Paper Giants: The Birth of Cleo and the children's series My Place. He is known for playing the role of Harman "Hammer" Pirovic on Seven Network soap opera Home and Away, for which he appeared for several episodes until his character was killed off in a showdown between Hammer, Charlie Buckton and Darryl Braxton.

Samuel made his directorial debut with the film Sanctuary in 2012.

In 2014, Samuel was cast in Asthma, the hotly anticipated directorial debut from Jake Hoffman, alongside Iggy Pop, Rene Ricard and Krysten Ritter.

In 2015, Samuel played Skeet du Pont in the acclaimed ABC series The Beautiful Lie and Jacob Harding in the thriller film The Stanford Prison Experiment.

As one of his most recognizable performances, Samuel appeared as Owen, the leader of the Wolves gang, in the American post-apocalyptic zombie series The Walking Dead.

In 2016, Samuel was cast as famous Batman villain The Mad Hatter, the main antagonist of the third season of Gotham. He continued to play the character in a recurring capacity during the fourth season, beginning to appear again with the episode "Ace Chemicals" of Season 5. 
Secret City is an Australian political thriller television series based on the best-selling novels The Marmalade Files, The Mandarin Code, and The Shadow Game by Chris Uhlmann and Steve Lewis. The show filmed in 2016 and Samuel plays Felix .

In 2018, Samuel played monstrous character, Lewis in Australian movie Pimped.

Personal life 
Samuel enjoys gardening and woodworking hobbies and once built his own dining table.

Samuel planned to be an actor from an early age and was inspired by his brother's high school theatre performances. When speaking about his close relationship with his older brother and fellow actor Xavier, Samuel stated "I admire my brother so much. He's been a wealth of support and knowledge. Having a best friend to go through this world with, and your career…I feel very fortunate to have that."

Filmography

Film

Short film

Television

References

External links
 

Living people
Australian screenwriters
Australian directors
National Institute of Dramatic Art alumni
1988 births
21st-century Australian male actors
Australian male soap opera actors